The Penguin Parade is a 1938 Warner Bros. Merrie Melodies directed by Tex Avery. The short was released on April 23, 1938.

Synopsis 
The cartoon takes place at a nightclub for penguins (and walruses). The club is called The Club Iceberg. The stage show includes a Bing Crosby-like penguin.

Reception
Motion Picture Exhibitor (April 15, 1938): "A musical revue at an Artie Penguin Night Club. "Fats Waller" pounds out music. There is an amusing little double talking M.C. Animation is very smooth, music is hot, tuneful. This constitutes a moderately funny cartoon for all classes."

Voice cast 
 Mel Blanc as Drunk Penguin/Dancing Penguin
 Tex Avery as Walrus

References

External links
 

Merrie Melodies short films
Films directed by Tex Avery
1938 animated films
1938 films
Films scored by Carl Stalling
1930s Warner Bros. animated short films
Animated films about penguins
1930s English-language films